Praise Ye Jah is Jamaican reggae singer Sizzla's third studio album. It was released on Xterminator on October 21, 1997. The songs were written by Sizzla and produced by Philip "Fatis" Burrell.

Track listing
"Praise Ye Jah" - 3:53
"Dem a Wonder" - 4:01
"Homeless" - 4:03
"Blackness" - 3:59
"Inna Dem Face" - 3:46
"Give Thanks" - 4:20
"Hail Selassie" - 3:54
"No Other Like Jah" - 3:53
"How Dem Flex" - 3:59
"Cowboy" - 3:46
"Greedy Joe" - 3:40
"Did You Ever" - 3:52
"Government" - 3:47

External links
 Sizzla website
 [ Praise Ye Jah] at Allmusic

1997 albums
Sizzla albums